Evaldo Gouveia de Oliveira (8 August 1928 – 29 May 2020), better known as simply Evaldo Gouveia, was a Brazilian singer-songwriter of the genre MPB.

Life
Born in Orós, a small city in the Brazilian state of Ceará, he moved with his family to neighboring city of Iguatu when only 3 months old.

At the age of 11, he moved to his birth state capital city of Fortaleza where he started his precocious musical career. There in the 1950s he created and joined a band called Trio Nagô with his fellow musicians and friends Mário Alves and Epaminondas de Souza, releasing six studio albums and various extended plays.

Eventually, Gouveia went to Rio de Janeiro in order to pursue a solo career, and achieved stardom due to his friendship with fellow singer Altemar Dutra, who helped Gouveia by singing his songs and making them popular.

As a solo act, Gouveia released seven studio albums and various extended plays, most of them featuring fellow singers Adelino Moreira and Jair Amorim, even though they never formed a band.

Illness and death
In late 2017, Gouveia suffered a stroke that left him with lifelong sequelae.

On 29 May 2020, Gouveia died in Fortaleza at the age 91 due to complications brought on by COVID-19 during the COVID-19 pandemic in Brazil.

Discography

With Trio Nagô

Studio albums

Solo act

Studio albums

References

External links
 

Rio Carnival
People from Ceará
20th-century Brazilian male singers
20th-century Brazilian singers
Música Popular Brasileira singers
21st-century Brazilian male singers
21st-century Brazilian singers
1928 births
2020 deaths
Brazilian male singer-songwriters
Deaths from the COVID-19 pandemic in Ceará